Blastochloris sulfoviridis is a bacterium from the genus of Blastochloris which uses sulfur compounds as a source of energy. Blastochloris sulfoviridis was isolated from a sulfur spring in the Soviet Union

References

External links
Type strain of Blastochloris sulfoviridis at BacDive -  the Bacterial Diversity Metadatabase

Hyphomicrobiales
Bacteria described in 1997